Antônio José da Silva Filho, usually known as Biro-Biro (born May 18, 1955), is a retired professional Brazilian footballer who played as a defensive midfielder for several Campeonato Brasileiro Série A clubs.

Playing career
Biro-Biro started his career in 1977, playing for Sport, where he won that season's Campeonato Pernambucano. In 1978, he moved to Corinthians, where he was mistakenly called Lero-Lero by the club's president, Vicente Matheus, during the players presentation at the club. During his eleven seasons as a Corinthians player, he won the Campeonato Paulista four times, in 1979, 1982, 1983 and in 1988, won the Placar's Campeonato Brasileiro Série A Bola de Prata award in 1982, and he scored 75 goals, in 592 matches, placing him as the fifth player with the most appearances for Corinthians. After playing for Portuguesa in 1990 and in 1991, he played for Coritiba in 1991, Guarani from 1991 to 1993 and Paulista in 1993, before playing for Remo in 1993 and in 1994, where he won the Campeonato Paraense in 1993. In 1994, he played for Botafogo-SP then he retired in 1995, while playing for Nacional-SP.

Managerial career
Biro-Biro started his managerial career in 1998, as Mauaense's head coach.

Honors
Besides winning the Bola de Prata in 1982, Biro-Biro won the following honors during his playing career:

References

1959 births
Living people
Brazilian footballers
Brazilian football managers
Sport Club do Recife players
Campeonato Brasileiro Série A players
Sport Club Corinthians Paulista players
Associação Portuguesa de Desportos players
Coritiba Foot Ball Club players
Guarani FC players
Paulista Futebol Clube players
Clube do Remo players
Botafogo Futebol Clube (SP) players
Nacional Atlético Clube (SP) players
Associação Atlética Francana managers
People from Olinda
Association football midfielders
Sportspeople from Pernambuco